Malegaon MIDC is an industrial zone in the Sinnar taluka of Nashik district, Maharashtra state, India.

Demographics 
According to Census of India 2011, the total population of Malegaon was 2955. 1824 males and 1131 females. The number of house holds is estimated to be 622.

Tourism 
Malegaon is home to the Gargoti Museum which houses a collection of mineral specimens found in the surrounding area. The museum is noted for its collection of zeolites.

Industry
Malegaon is home to one of the branches of the Maharashtra Industrial Development Corporation, a state-owned collection of industrial parks. The Malegaon MIDC is home to companies involved in manufacturing and pharmaceuticals.

Education
Schools in the Malegaon MIDC include
 Vasant Rao Naik 
 Sir Visvesvaraya Institute Of Technology

References

Villages in Nashik district